Four Acres is an unincorporated community in Placer County, California. It lies at an elevation of 1234 feet (376 m).

References

Unincorporated communities in California
Unincorporated communities in Placer County, California